Valma Ondine Howell (15 June 1896 – 16 December 1979), was an Australian artist of pastoral watercolours of western Victoria and actor.

Early years
Valma Ondine Howell was born in Beaufort, where she was to spend most of her life. The first 14 years of her life were spent with her family on her father's sheep grazing property 'Dookerimbut' between Beaufort and Skipton in western Victoria. She boarded at Ruyton Girls' school in Melbourne during the 1910s. During the Depression she worked as a housekeeper at Mooramong sheep station near Skipton. It was here she later befriended the Canadian-born Hollywood silent screen star Claire Adams, wife of D.J.S. (Scobie) Mackinnon, then chairman of  the Victoria Racing Club (VRC).

Career
Valma Ondine Howell's most famous subjects include the Fiery Creek catchment and the Yalla-Y-Poora property. Her one known film role is in the film Night Club (1952); one of only a handful of films made in Melbourne in that decade. 

After a trip to India in 1955, which she undertook to clear up her father's estate, her art began to include the human form and non-realist representation. Her sister, the poet and author Ada Verdun Howell, lived with her for many years on Stockyard Hill Rd, where they maintained a bush block famous for its kangaroo grass woodland.

Personal life
She was the great-granddaughter of Captain Charles Swanston, East India Company employee and Port Phillip Association investor. She was briefly married to fellow actor/entertainer Joff Ellen.

References

Additional References
Of Sheep and Men: a History of Skipton by Notman, G. Claude. Skipton, Victoria Claude Notman, 1981
History of Ruyton 1878–1956, Daniell, Hilda. Ramsay, Ware Publishing, Melbourne 1956.

External links

1896 births
1979 deaths
Australian women painters
20th-century Australian painters
20th-century Australian women artists